Chris John (born 25 August 1960) is a former New Zealand rugby union player. She made her debut off the bench for the Black Ferns at RugbyFest 1990 against the Netherlands and started in the match against the Soviet Union.

References 

1960 births
Living people
New Zealand female rugby union players
New Zealand women's international rugby union players